Baotou Donghe Airport  is an airport serving the city of Baotou in Inner Mongolia, China. Eurasia Aviation Corporation, a joint venture between Ministry of Transportation and Communications of China and Lufthansa, built the airport in 1934. The airport was occupied by Japan in World War II. It was renovated and expanded multiple times to support the growing demands during the war.

The airport is a class 4D airport which supports take off and landing of aircraft up to the size of  Boeing 737-900 and Boeing 767-300ER. It is equipped at both ends with Instrument Landing Systems (ILS), Approach Lighting Systems (ALS) with sequenced flashers, and touchdown zone (TDZ) lighting. Terminal 1 was opened in 1999, Terminal 2 was opened in 2014, is a domestic terminal. On the first floor of the terminal 2 complex is the arrival hall, the second floor is the departure hall, with 22 check in counters and 8 security check lanes.

Airlines and destinations

Accidents and incidents
On November 21, 2004, China Eastern Airlines Flight 5210 crashed shortly after takeoff from Baotou Erliban Airport. All 53 people on board the aircraft and two people on the ground were killed.

References

External links

Airports in Inner Mongolia